This is a list of the Nebraska Republican presidential primary results.

1912

1916

1920

1924

1928

1932

1936

1940

1944

1948

1952

1956

1960

1964

1968

1972

1976

1980

1984

1988

1992

1996

2000

2004

2008

2012

2016

References

Sources

Nebraska Republican primaries